Khirbat al-Majdal  was a Palestinian Arab village in the Tulkarm Subdistrict. It was depopulated during the 1947–48 Civil War in Mandatory Palestine on March 1, 1948, under Operation Coastal Clearing. It was located 10 km northwest of Tulkarm.

History
Khirbat al-Majdal  was located on the Crusader  place called Megedallum. The site had a well, around which bedouin gradually settled.

The village had a shrine for a local sage known by al-Shaykh Abdallah. Today, Sde Yitzhaq is located near the village lands, but on land belonging to Raml Zayta.

References

Bibliography

External links
 Welcome To Khirbat al-Majdal
Khirbat al-Majdal, Zochrot
Survey of Western Palestine, Map 11:    IAA, Wikimedia commons

Arab villages depopulated during the 1948 Arab–Israeli War
District of Tulkarm